Tales of Great Neck Glory is an album by the American alternative rock band Sammy, released in 1996. The album was put out by DGC Records; band member Luke Wood was working for the company at the time. The first single was "Neptune Ave (Ortho Hi Rise)".

Sammy broke up shortly after the album's release.

Production
Sammy used three different drummers during the recording sessions for the album.

Critical reception

Robert Christgau wrote that "rather than hiding their privilege behind obscure witticisms, these alt-rock  tell it like it is for their cultural class—bright, affluent kids who still have more options than they know what to do with." Trouser Press called the album "powerful and loads of fun," writing that "on atmospheric songs like 'Blue Oyster Bay' and the quiet 'Anything', the band expands its emotional range without leaving behind the art-damaged take on pop that makes its first album effective." 

The Waikato Times dismissed it as "not quite bad enough to become a cult classic, but not quite good enough to buy." Calling the band "posers," the Fort Worth Star-Telegram wrote that Sammy "sound like every other Geffen band out there, especially Sonic Youth and Weezer." The Arkansas Democrat-Gazette wrote: "Playing like Elastica's kid brothers and writing like graduate students bucking for an A, Sammy has style to burn."

AllMusic deemed it "a fun, if derivative, album," writing that Sammy "distills the half-mumbled, half-sung vocals, loopy guitars, off-kilter percussion, and sunny pop hooks that Pavement made their own in the late '80s." In a retrospective feature, Spin panned the album as a "cutout-bin regular."

Track listing

Personnel
Jesse Hartman - vocals, piano, guitar
Luke Wood - bass, guitar, vocals

References

1996 albums
DGC Records albums